Night Call is the third studio album by British artist Years & Years, released on 21 January 2022 by Polydor Records. It serves as the follow-up to their second album Palo Santo (2018). Marking the first album release of Years & Years as Alexander's solo project following the departure of Mikey Goldsworthy and Emre Türkmen, it was preceded by three singles; "Starstruck", "Crave", "Sweet Talker" with Swedish DJ duo Galantis. Alexander embarked on the Night Call Tour in support of the album in the UK and Ireland.

Background
Years & Years released their second album Palo Santo on 6 July 2018, supported by four singles. The album was commercially and critically successful, receiving critical acclaim from music critics and debuting in the top 3 on the UK Albums Chart. They also embarked on the Palo Santo Tour (2018–19) in support of the album.

On 18 March 2021, the band announced a third Years & Years album to be released in 2021. It was simultaneously announced that Goldsworthy and Türkmen had stepped down as active members, and that the act would continue as Alexander's solo project.

On 28 September 2021, the album's cover art, title, and release date were revealed on his social media accounts. Speaking about Night Call, Alexander said in a statement: "I was writing from a fantastical space, stuck in the same four walls. I wanted to have as much pleasure as possible in the music."

Singles 
On 23 March 2021, Olly Alexander announced the lead single off the album "Starstruck", which was released on 8 April. It was Alexander's first song release with Years & Years being a solo project, following the departures of Goldsworthy and Türkmen. The song peaked at 31 on the UK Singles Chart, and was promoted with a music video, which was released on 12 April, and a variety of remixes, including one with Australian singer Kylie Minogue.

"Crave" was released on 28 September 2021 as the second single off the album, which was announced along with the album announcement. A music video for the song premiered on the same day.

"Sweet Talker", which features Swedish electronic music duo Galantis, was released as the third and final single off the album on 24 November 2021. The music video for the song premiered on 9 December, and the song peaked at 26 on the UK Singles Chart. It was hailed Billboard as "a romantic, glorious dancefloor anthem" and Dancing Astronaut labelling it "a tour de force".

Other notable songs 
Ahead of the album's release, "Sooner or Later" was released on 14 January 2022 with a lyric video being released on the same day. The song was co-written by Alexander, Clarence Coffee Jr., and Mark Ralph, who also produced the song. The track is a synth-pop track, with it lyrically talking about Alexander chasing after a lost love who broke his heart."

"Hallucination" was released on 18 February 2022, which featured on a reissued deluxe edition of Night Call on Spotify. The song features Kosovo Albanian DJ Regard and lyrically finds Alexander "warning off serial heartbreakers."

Critical reception 

Night Call has received generally favourable reviews from music critics. At Metacritic, which assigns a normalised rating out of 100 to reviews from mainstream critics, the album has an average score of 71 based on 13 reviews. Aggregator AnyDecentMusic?  gave it 6.6 out of 10, based on their assessment of the critical consensus.

AllMusic's Mark Collar said "While Night Call builds nicely upon Years & Years' indie electronic roots, it primarily feels like a new beginning for Alexander as he boldly embraces his pop future." 

In a positive review Robin Murray from Clash said that "It never quite transgresses those influences, yet in terms of sheer charm and bravura it places Olly right up there with his idols."  

Ben Devlin from musicOMH wrote that "Night Call, for all its merits, is a selection of pop songs that have no meaningful connection and which one could hear anywhere."

In a mixed review writing for The Skinny Nadia Younes said "Unfortunately, Olly Alexander’s first solo outing as Years & Years doesn’t quite hit the mark, but even though they may be few and far between, there are still some glimmers of potential on Night Call."

Track listing

Charts

Weekly charts

Year-end charts

Certifications

Release history

References

2022 albums
Polydor Records albums
Years & Years albums